Dustin Long may refer to:
Dustin Long (American football) (born 1981), American footballer
Dustin Long (writer), American novelist